Char Divas Sasuche ( Four days of a mother-in-law) is an Indian Marathi soap opera that aired on ETV Marathi. It is the second longest running Indian serial with over 3,147 episodes. It was premiered on November 2001 and ended on 5 January 2013. It was directed by Khalil Herekar.

This Marathi serial entered the Limca Book of World Records as the longest-running series on Indian television. This serial created an history in the Indian Television by becoming the first Indian serial across the other languages to cross both 2000 and 3000 episodes and ran for 11 years.

Plot 
Ashalata and Anuradha, the pillars of the Deshmukh family, who have been portrayed as an ideal women, deals with life practically and fights it out when necessary as they strived for the well being of their family. Ashalata Deshmukh is the matriarch of the Deshmukh family whose decisions and words are followed. Her son Ravi goes against her decision and marries Anuradha who is a very simple, sensible and a self-respecting girl. 

Anuradha is unaware that she married Ravi against his mother's wish. The story follows on how will she get Ravi's support and copes up with the family. Overall, it is the saga of human relationships around the Deshmukh family - tales of love and hate, losses and victories, good and evil, strength and perseverance.

Cast 
 Rohini Hattangadi as Ashalata Deshmukh
 Kavita Lad as Anuradha Deshmukh
 Pankaj Vishnu as Ravi Deshmukh
 Priya Marathe as Sona Deshmukh
 Sagar Talashikar as Ashok Deshmukh
 Anand Kale as Ashok Deshmukh
 Kashmira Kulkarni as Urmila Deshmukh
 Manasi Naik as Priyanka Deshmukh
 Gauri as Mrudula
 Prasad Oak
 Sulekha Talwalkar
 Rajesh Shringarpure
 Bhargavi Chirmule
 Prachi Mate
 Mugdha Ranade
 Smita Oak
 Ashwini Apte
 Abhijit Kelkar
 Sarika Nilatkar
 Prajakta kulkarni
 Jayant Ghate
 Pallavi Subhash
 Dipti Devi
 Vijay Mishra as Dhananjay Mohite
 Vikas Patil
 Anjali Ujawane
 Shailesh Datar
 Trupti Bhoir
 Ashok Sathe
 Samir Vijay
 Vilas Ujwane
 Sunila Karambelkar
 Shweta Shinde
 Anand Abhyankar
 Aditya Vaidya

Reception and impact 
It was one of the top rated serials in Marathi during its running period. During its run time, it was the longest ran Indian soap opera.

The serial has beaten many of the mega Hindi serials of various channels in the 8 to 8.30 pm slot. The serial has even beaten Kyunki Saas Bhi Kabhi Bahu Thi.

References

External links 
 
 Char Divas Sasuche at Voot

Marathi-language television shows
2001 Indian television series debuts
2013 Indian television series endings
Colors Marathi original programming